Education in England is overseen by the United Kingdom's Department for Education. Local government authorities are responsible for implementing policy for public education and state-funded schools at a local level.

England also has a tradition of private schools (some of which call themselves public schools) and home education: legally, parents may choose to educate their children by any permitted means. State-funded schools may be selective grammar schools or non-selective comprehensive schools (non-selective schools in counties that have grammar schools may be called by other names, such as high schools). Comprehensive schools are further subdivided by funding into free schools, other academies, any remaining Local Authority schools and others. More freedom is given to free schools, including most religious schools, and other academies in terms of curriculum. All are subject to assessment and inspection by Ofsted (the Office for Standards in Education, Children's Services and Skills).

The state-funded education system is divided into Key Stages, based upon the student's age by August 31. The Early Years Foundation Stage is for ages 3–4. Primary education is divided into Key Stage 1 for ages 5–6 and Key Stage 2 for ages 7–10. Secondary education is divided into Key Stage 3 for ages 11–13 and Key Stage 4 for ages 14–15. Key Stage 5 is for ages 16–17. Students 18 and older receive tertiary education.

At the end of Year 11 (at age 15 or 16, depending on their birthdays) students typically take General Certificate of Secondary Education (GCSE) exams or other Level 1 or Level 2 qualifications. For students who do not pursue academic qualifications until the end of Year 13, these qualifications are roughly equivalent to the completion of high school in many other countries, or high school graduation in the United States and Canada.

While education is compulsory until 18, schooling is compulsory to 16: thus post-16 education can take a number of forms, and may be academic or vocational. This can involve continued schooling, known as "sixth form" or "college", leading (typically after two years of further study) to A-level qualifications, or a number of alternative Level 3 qualifications such as Business and Technology Education Council (BTEC), the International Baccalaureate (IB), Cambridge Pre-U, WJEC or Eduqas. It can also include work-based apprenticeships or traineeships, or volunteering.

Higher education often begins with a three-year bachelor's degree. Postgraduate degrees include master's degrees, either taught or by research, and doctoral level research degrees that usually take at least three years. Tuition fees for first degrees in public universities are £9,250 per academic year for English, Welsh and European Union students.

The Regulated Qualifications Framework (RQF) covers national school examinations and vocational education qualifications. It is referenced to the European Qualifications Framework, and thus to other qualifications frameworks across the European Union. The Framework for Higher Education Qualifications (FHEQ), which is tied to the RQF, covers degrees and other qualifications from degree-awarding bodies. This is referenced to the Qualifications Framework of the European Higher Education Area developed under the Bologna process.

The Programme for International Student Assessment coordinated by the OECD currently ranks the overall knowledge and skills of British 15-year-olds as 13th in the world in reading literacy, mathematics and science, with the average British student scoring 503.7, compared with the OECD average of 493. In 2011, the Trends in International Mathematics and Science Study (TIMSS) rated 13–14-year-old pupils in England and Wales 10th in the world for maths and 9th for science.

History of English education

Until 1870 all schools were charitable or private institutions, but in that year the Elementary Education Act 1870 permitted local governments to complement the existing elementary schools in order to fill any gaps. The Education Act 1902 allowed local authorities to create secondary schools. The Education Act 1918 abolished fees for elementary schools.

Women's colleges were established in the 19th century to give women access to university education, the first being Bedford College, London (1849), Girton College, Cambridge (1869) and Newnham College, Cambridge (1871). The University of London established special examinations for women in 1868 and opened its degrees to women in 1878. University College Bristol (now the University of Bristol) became the first mixed higher education institution on its foundation in 1876, followed in 1878 by University College London (which had held some mixed classes from 1871).

Legally compulsory education
Full-time education is compulsory for all children aged 5 to 18, either at school or otherwise, with a child beginning primary education during the school year they turn 5. Children between the ages of 3 and 5 are entitled to 600 hours per year of optional, state-funded, pre-school education. This can be provided in "playgroups", nurseries, community childcare centres or nursery classes in schools.

The age at which a pupil may choose to stop education is commonly known as the "leaving age" for compulsory education. This age was raised to 18 by the Education and Skills Act 2008; the change took effect in 2013 for 16-year-olds and 2015 for 17-year-olds. From this time, the school leaving age (which remains 16) and the education leaving age (which is now 18) have been separated. State-provided schooling and sixth-form education are paid for by taxes.

All children in England must currently therefore receive an effective education (at school or otherwise) from the first "prescribed day", which falls on or after their fifth birthday until their 18th birthday, and must remain in school until the last Friday in June of the school year in which they turn 16. The education leaving age was raised in 2013 to the year in which they turn 17 and in 2015 to their 18th birthday for those born on, or after, 1 September 1997. The prescribed days are 31 August, 31 December and 31 March. The school year begins on 1 September (or 1 August if a term starts in August).

The compulsory stages of education are broken into a Foundation Stage (covering the last part of optional and first part of compulsory education), 4 Key Stages, and post-16 education, sometimes unofficially termed Key Stage Five, which takes a variety of forms, including 6th Form, which covers the last 2 years of Secondary Education in schools.

Stages of compulsory education
A number of different terms and names exist for the various schools and stages a pupil may go through during the compulsory part of their education. Grammar schools are selective schools, admitting children from 11 years old onward; they are normally state-funded, though fee paying independent grammars do exist. Schools offering nursery (pre-school) education commonly accept pupils from age 3; however, some schools do accept pupils younger than this.

State-funded schools

Some 93% of children between the ages of 3 and 18 are in education in state-funded schools without charge (other than for activities such as swimming, cultural visits, theatre visits and field trips for which a voluntary payment can be requested, and limited charges at state-funded boarding schools).

All schools are legally required to have a website where they must publish details of their governance, finance, curriculum intent and staff and pupil protection policies to comply with The School Information (England) (Amendment) Regulations 2012 and 2016. Ofsted monitors these.

Since 1998, there have been six main types of maintained (state-funded) school in England:
 Academy schools, established by the 1997-2010 Labour Government to replace poorly-performing community schools in areas of high social and economic deprivation. Their start-up costs are typically funded by private means, such as entrepreneurs or NGOs, with running costs met by central government and, like Foundation schools, are administratively free from direct local authority control. The 2010 Conservative-Liberal Democrat coalition government expanded the role of Academies in the Academy Programme, in which a wide number of schools in non-deprived areas were also encouraged to become Academies, thereby essentially replacing the role of foundation schools established by the previous Labour government. They are monitored directly by the Department for Education. Some Academies operate selective entrance requirements for some of their entry, similar to Grammar schools.
 Community schools, in which the local authority employs the schools' staff, owns the schools' lands and buildings, and has primary responsibility for admissions.
 Free schools, introduced by the Conservative-Liberal Democrat coalition, are newly established schools in England set up by parents, teachers, charities or businesses, where there is a perceived local need for more schools. They are funded by taxpayers, are academically non-selective and free to attend, and like Foundation schools and Academies, are not controlled by a local authority. They are ultimately accountable to the Secretary of State for Education. Free schools are an extension of the existing Academy Programme. The first 24 free schools opened in Autumn 2011.
 Foundation schools, in which the governing body employs the staff and has primary responsibility for admissions. School land and buildings are owned by the governing body or by a charitable foundation. The foundation appoints a minority of governors. Many of these schools were formerly grant maintained schools. In 2005 the Labour government proposed allowing all schools to become Foundation schools if they wished.
 Voluntary Aided schools, linked to a variety of organisations. They can be faith schools (about two thirds Church of England-affiliated; just under one third Roman Catholic Church, and a few another faith), or non-denominational schools, such as those linked to London Livery Companies. The charitable foundation contributes towards the capital costs of the school (typically 10%), and appoints a majority of the school governors. The governing body employs the staff and has primary responsibility for admissions.
 Voluntary Controlled schools, which are almost always faith schools, with the lands and buildings often owned by a charitable foundation. However, the local authority employs the schools' staff and has primary responsibility for admissions.
University technical colleges (UTCs), established in 2010 by the Conservative-Liberal Democrat coalition, are a type of secondary school in England that are led by a sponsor university and have close ties to local business and industry. They are funded by the taxpayer, and are non-selective, free to attend and not controlled by a local authority. The university and industry partners support the curriculum development of the UTC, provide professional development opportunities for teachers, and guide suitably qualified students to industrial apprenticeships, foundation degrees or full degrees. The sponsor university appoints the majority of the UTC's governors and key members of staff. Pupils transfer to a UTC at the age of 14, part-way through their secondary education. The distinctive element of UTCs is that they offer technically oriented courses of study, combining National Curriculum requirements with technical and vocational elements. UTCs must specialise in subjects that require technical and modern equipment, but they also all teach business skills and the use of information and communications technology. UTCs are also supposed to offer clear routes into higher education or further learning in work.

In addition, three of the fifteen City Technology Colleges established in the 1980s still remain; the rest having converted to academies. These are state-funded all-ability secondary schools which charge no fees but which are independent of local authority control. There are also a small number of state-funded boarding schools.

English state-funded primary schools are almost all local schools with a small catchment area. More than half are owned by the Local Authority, though many are (nominally) voluntary controlled and some are voluntary aided. Some schools just include infants (aged 4 to 7) and some just juniors (aged 7 to 11). Some are linked, with automatic progression from the infant school to the junior school, and some are not. A few areas still have first schools for ages around 4 to 8 and middle schools for ages 8 or 9 to 12 or 13.

English secondary schools are mostly comprehensive (i.e. no entry exam), although the intake of comprehensive schools can vary widely, especially in urban areas with several local schools. Nearly 90% of state-funded secondary schools are specialist schools, receiving extra funding to develop one or more subjects (performing arts, art & design, business, humanities, languages, science, mathematics, technology, engineering, etc.) in which the school specialises, which can select up to 10% of their intake for aptitude in the specialism. In areas children can enter a prestigious grammar school if they pass the eleven plus exam; there are also a number of isolated fully selective grammar schools and a few dozen partially selective schools. A significant minority of state-funded schools are faith schools, which are attached to religious groups, most often the Church of England or the Roman Catholic Church.

All state-funded schools are regularly inspected by the Office for Standards in Education, often known simply as Ofsted. Ofsted publish reports on the quality of education, learning outcomes, management, and safety and behaviour of young people at a particular school on a regular basis. Schools judged by Ofsted to be providing an inadequate standard of education may be subject to special measures, which could include replacing the governing body and senior staff. School inspection reports are published online and directly sent to parents and guardians.

Independent schools

Approximately 7% of school children in England attend privately run, fee-charging private schools. Some independent schools for 13–18-year-olds are known for historical reasons as 'public schools' and for 8–13-year-olds as 'prep schools'. Some schools offer scholarships for those with particular skills or aptitudes, or bursaries to allow students from less financially well-off families to attend. Independent schools do not have to follow the National Curriculum, and their teachers are not required or regulated by law to have official teaching qualifications. The Independent Schools Inspectorate regularly publishes reports on the quality of education in all independent schools.

School subjects

State-funded schools are obliged to teach thirteen subjects, including the three core subjects of English, Mathematics and Science. The structure of the 2014 national curriculum is:

All schools are also required to teach religious education at all key stages, and secondary schools must provide sex and relationship education.

In addition to the compulsory subjects, students at Key Stage 4 have a statutory entitlement to be able to study at least one subject from the arts (comprising art and design, dance, music, photography, media studies, film studies, graphics, drama and media arts), design and technology (comprising design and technology, electronics, engineering, food preparation and nutrition), the humanities (comprising geography and history), business and enterprise (comprising business studies and economics) and one modern language.

Curriculum

The National Curriculum provides pupils with an introduction to the essential knowledge they require to be educated citizens. It introduces pupils to the best that has been thought and said, and helps engender an appreciation of human creativity and achievements. It covers what subjects are taught and the standards children should reach in each subject.

These aims set out to support the statutory duties of schools to offer a curriculum which is balanced and broadly based and which promotes the spiritual, moral, cultural, mental and physical development of pupils at the school and of society, while preparing pupils at the school for the opportunities, responsibilities and experiences of later life, as set out in the Education Act 2002.

Nursery

In Early Years, the curriculum is organised into seven areas of learning;

 Communication and language
 Physical development
 Personal, social and emotional development
 Literacy
 Mathematics
 Understanding the World
 Expressive arts and design

Foundation

In foundation, the curriculum is organised into six areas of learning;

 Personal, social and emotional development
 Communication, language and literacy
 Mathematical development
 Knowledge and Understanding of the World
 Physical development
 Creative development

Primary

In primary school, school children remain in one class throughout the year, but may change classrooms for English and Mathematics. Each school can decide the name of classrooms: some choose world animals, significant individuals, world countries and continents, or simply their year range (Year 1, Year 2, Year 3, etc.).

English, mathematics, and science are normally taught in the mornings and art & design, history, geography, design & technology, ancient & modern languages, religion, citizenship, computing, music, physical education, etc. in the afternoons. Literacy, reading, mathematics, science, geographical and historical skills are often incorporated in cross-curriculum assessments and activities.

Topics & themes are covered around world affairs, healthy eating, nature, wildlife, the environment, mindfulness, etc. Every primary school has a library, assembly hall, computing facilities, and playground. Exercise books, novels, pens and stationery are provided by the school.

National Curriculum assessments (known as standard attainment tests or Sats) in Reading; Grammar, Punctuation, Spelling; and Mathematics are taken place at the end of Key Stage 1 and Key Stage 2. In addition to the tests, teachers are required to provide teacher assessments in the core subject areas of Reading, Writing, Mathematics and Science.

Secondary

In secondary school, school children have their own tutor group, but are split up into different classes and have their own timetable (sometimes divided between week A and week B).

Tutoring lessons in the mornings and late afternoons are for citizenship studies and the rest of the day consists of subjects such as English literature, English language, mathematics, science (biology, chemistry, physics, astronomy, etc.), citizenship, history, geography, art and design, design and technology, drama and media arts, modern languages (French, German, Spanish, Italian, etc.), business and economics, religion, music, photography, engineering, computing, physical education, etc.

In the final two years of secondary education, school children pursue an optional programme of study from interests or career prospects; English language, English literature, mathematics, science, citizenship studies, religious studies, computing, and physical education remain core and foundation subjects. A range of entitlement and optional subjects from the sciences and mathematics, humanities and social sciences, business and enterprise, arts and design, design and technology, and ancient and modern languages are studied.

Non compulsory subjects such as journalism, digital technology, home economics are offered and studied by some schools.

England allows children to specialise in their academic learning fields earlier on than other countries. This allows stronger educational engagement and more time for children to spend in their most respected subjects.

School children are provided with school planners; which hold learning resources, school management, and timetables. Every secondary school has a library, assembly hall, playground, dining hall, computing facilities, and a sports hall or gymnasium. Some secondary schools have a theatre for performing arts. Exercise books, novels, pens and sometimes stationery are provided by the school, although, school children are expected to bring in a basic level of stationery equipment.

School dinners
In Key Stage 1 and foundation, all children in government-funded schools are entitled to free school meals and fruit. In Key Stage 2, Key Stage 3 and Key Stage 4, students from low income families may be eligible for free school meals. All school meals must follow the government's healthy eating standards and promote a healthy diet.

School uniform
 
School uniforms are defined by individual schools, within the constraint that uniform regulations must not discriminate on the grounds of sex, race, disability, sexual orientation, gender reassignment, religion or belief. Schools may choose to permit trousers for girls or religious dress. Local councils may provide assistance with the cost of uniforms and PE kit.

After school activities
Schools may provide childcare outside of school hours, including breakfast clubs in the early mornings and after school curriculum activities (languages, food preparation, arts, crafts, geography and history, gardening, sports, reading, science, mathematics, etc.).

Education by means other than schooling

The Education Act 1944 (Section 36) stated that parents are responsible for the education of their children, "by regular attendance at school or otherwise", which allows children to be educated at home. The legislation places no requirement for parents who choose not to send their children to school to follow the National Curriculum, or to give formal lessons, or to follow school hours and terms, and parents do not need to be qualified teachers. Small but increasing numbers of parents do choose to educate their children outside the conventional school systems. Officially referred to as "Elective Home Education", teaching ranges from structured homeschooling (using a school-style curriculum) to less-structured unschooling. Education Otherwise has supported parents who wished to educate their children outside school since the 1970s. The state provides no financial support to parents who choose to educate their children outside of school.

Post-16 education
Students at both state schools and independent schools typically take GCSE examinations, which mark the end of compulsory education in school. After this, students can attain further education (the "sixth form"); this can either be in the sixth form of a school or a specialized sixth form or further education college. Alternatively, students can also opt for apprenticeships instead of a sixth form.

In the 16–17 age group by August 31, sixth form education is not compulsory, but mandatory education or training until the age of 18 was phased in under the Education and Skills Act 2008, with 16-year-olds in 2013 and for 17-year-olds in September 2015. While students may still leave school on the last Friday in June, they must remain in education of some form until their 18th birthday.

Above school-leaving age, the independent and state sectors are similarly structured.

Sixth form colleges / further education colleges
Students over 16 typically study in the sixth form of a school (sixth form is a historical term for Years 12–13), in a separate sixth form college, or in a Further Education (FE) College. Courses at FE colleges, referred to as further education courses, can also be studied by adults over 18. Students typically study Level-3 qualifications such as A-Levels, BTEC National Awards and level-3 NVQs. Some 16–18 students will be encouraged to study Key Skills in Communication, Application of Number, and Information Technology at this time.

Apprenticeships and traineeships
The National Apprenticeship Service helps people 16 or more years of age enter apprenticeships in order to learn a skilled trade. Traineeships are also overseen by the National Apprenticeship Service, and are education and a training programmes that are combined with work experience to give trainees the skills needed to get an apprenticeship.

T Levels
T Levels are a technical qualification introduced between 2020 and 2023 in England. The aim of the new T Levels is to improve the teaching and administration of technical education which will enable students to directly enter skilled employment, further study or a higher apprenticeship. Students will be able to take a T Level in the following subject areas:

accountancy
agriculture, land management and production
animal care and management
building services engineering
catering
craft and design
cultural heritage and visitor attractions
design and development
design, surveying and planning
digital business services
digital production, design and development
digital support and services
education
financial
hair, beauty and aesthetics
health
healthcare science
human resources
legal
maintenance, installation and repair
management and administration
manufacturing, processing and control
media, broadcast and production
onsite construction
science

Higher education

Higher education in England is provided by Higher Education (HE) colleges, university colleges, universities and private colleges.
Students normally enter higher education as undergraduates from age 18 onwards, and can study for a wide variety of vocational and academic qualifications, including certificates of higher education and higher national certificates at level 4, diplomas of higher education, higher national diplomas and foundation degrees at level 5, bachelor's degrees (normally with honours) at level 6, and integrated master's degrees and degrees in medicine, dentistry, and veterinary science at level 7.

Historically, undergraduate education outside a small number of private colleges and universities has been largely state-financed since the 1960s, with a contribution from top-up fees introduced in October 1998, however fees of up to £9,000 per annum have been charged from October 2012. There is a perceived hierarchy among universities, with the Russell Group seen as being composed of the country's more prestigious universities. League tables of universities are produced by private companies and generally cover the whole UK.

The state does not control university syllabuses, but it does influence admission procedures through the Office for Fair Access (OFFA), which approves and monitors access agreements to safeguard and promote fair access to higher education. The independent Quality Assurance Agency for Higher Education inspects universities to assure standards, advises on the granting of degree awarding powers and university title, and maintains the Quality Code for Higher Education, which includes the Framework for Higher Education Qualification. Unlike most degrees, the state has control over teacher training courses, and standards are monitored by Ofsted inspectors.

The typical first degree offered at English universities is the bachelor's degree with honours, which usually lasts for three years, although more vocational foundation degrees, typically lasting two years (or full-time equivalent) are also available in some institutions. Many institutions now offer an integrated master's degree, particularly in STEM subjects, as a first degree, which typically lasts for four years, the first three years running parallel to the bachelor's course. During a first degree students are known as undergraduates. The difference in fees between integrated and traditional postgraduate master's degrees (and that fees are capped at the first degree level for the former) makes taking an integrated master's degree as a first degree a more attractive option. Integrated master's degrees are often the standard route to chartered status for STEM professionals in England.

Postgraduate education
Students who have completed a first degree can apply for postgraduate and graduate courses. These include:
 Graduate certificates, graduate diplomas, professional graduate certificate in education – level 6 courses aimed at those who have already completed a bachelor's degree, often as conversion courses
 Postgraduate certificates, postgraduate diplomas, postgraduate certificate in education – level 7 courses shorter than a full master's degree
 Master's degrees (typically taken in one year, though research-based master's degrees may last for two) – taught or research degrees at level 7
 Doctorates (typically taken in three years) – research degrees at level 8, the top level of the qualifications frameworks, often requiring a master's degree for entry. These may be purely research based (PhD/DPhil) or research and practice (professional doctorates). "New Route" PhDs, introduced in 2001, take at least 4 years and incorporate teaching at master's level.

Postgraduate education is not automatically financed by the state.

Fees

Since October 1998, most undergraduates have paid fees that had risen to a set maximum of £3,375 per annum by the academic year 2011–12. These fees are repayable after graduation, contingent on attaining a certain level of income, with the state paying all fees for students from the poorest backgrounds. UK students are generally entitled to student loans for maintenance. Undergraduates admitted from the academic year 2012-13 have paid tuition fees set at a maximum of up to £9,000 per annum, with most universities charging over £6,000 per annum, and other higher education providers charging less.

Postgraduate fees vary but are generally more than undergraduate fees, depending on the degree and university. There are numerous bursaries (awarded to low income applicants) to offset undergraduate fees and, for postgraduates, full scholarships are available for most subjects, and are usually awarded competitively.

Different arrangements apply to English students studying in Scotland, and to Scottish and Welsh students studying in England. Students from outside the UK and the EU attending English universities are charged differing amounts, often in the region of £5,000 to £20,000 per annum for undergraduate and postgraduate degrees. The actual amount differs by institution and subject, with the lab based subjects charging a greater amount.

The gap between rich and poor students has slightly narrowed since the introduction of the higher fees. This may be because universities have used tuition fees to invest in bursaries and outreach schemes. In 2016, The Guardian noted that the number of disadvantaged students applying to university had increased by 72% from 2006 to 2015, a bigger rise than in Scotland, Wales or Northern Ireland. It wrote that most of the gap between richer and poorer students tends to open up between Key Stage 1 and Key Stage 4 (i.e. at secondary school), rather than when applying for university, and so the money raised from tuition fees should be spent there instead.

A study by Murphy, Scott-Clayton, and Wyness found that the introduction of tuition fees had "increased funding per head, educational standards, rising enrolments, and a narrowing of the participation gap between advantaged and disadvantaged students".

Adult education
Adult education, continuing education or lifelong learning is offered to students of all ages. This can include the vocational qualifications mentioned above, and also:
 One or two year access courses, to allow adults without suitable qualifications access to university.
 The Open University runs undergraduate and postgraduate distance learning programmes.
 The Workers' Educational Association offers large number of semi-recreational courses, with or without qualifications, made available by Local Education Authorities under the guise of Adult Education. Courses are available in a wide variety of areas, such as holiday languages, arts, crafts and yacht navigation.

Qualifications Frameworks

The two qualifications frameworks in England are the Regulated Qualifications Framework (RQF), for qualifications regulated by Ofqual, and the Framework for Higher Education Qualifications (FHEQ) for qualifications granted by bodies with degree awarding powers, overseen by the Quality Assurance Agency. These share a common numbering scheme for their levels, which was also used for the earlier Qualifications and Credit Framework. The RQF is linked to the European Qualifications Framework (EQF) and the FHEQ to the Qualifications Framework of the European Higher Education Area (QF-EHEA).

Standards
The Programme for International Student Assessment coordinated by the OECD currently ranks the overall knowledge and skills of British 15-year-olds as 13th in the world in reading literacy, mathematics, and science with the average British student scoring 503.7, compared with the OECD average of 493, ahead of the United States and most of Europe in 2018.

The United Nations ranks the United Kingdom (including England) 10th in the Education Index, measuring educational attainment, GDP per capita and life expectancy, ahead most of Europe.

From 1997 to 2010, the Labour government introduced a new type of school known as academies for poorly performing schools in areas of social deprivation. More former local council managed schools, deemed 'inadequate' or 'requiring improvement', transitioned to an academy trust in this period and beyond are now rated 'good' or 'outstanding'.

From 2010, the Conservative government raised discipline standards in schools; basic manners and politeness in classrooms became more prioritised. From 2015, more students were in 'good' and 'outstanding' rated schools from all social backgrounds than 2010.

Funding
Since 2018, English schools have been funded through a national formula. The Institute for Fiscal Studies maintains real spending on schooling per pupil has dropped by 8% since 2010. In August 2019, it was announced that the budget for schools and high needs would be increased by 6% (£2.6 billion) in 2020–21, £4.8 billion in 2021-22 and £7.1 billion in 2022-23 respectively – plus an extra £1.5 billion per year to fund additional pensions costs for teachers. This new funding includes £780 million in 2020–21 to support children with Special Educational Needs and Disabilities (SEND).

See also
 Education in the United Kingdom
 City Learning Centre
 British Schools Foundation
 Education by country
 Language education in the United Kingdom
 List of schools in England
 National Union of Students (United Kingdom)
 School uniforms in England
 Science Learning Centres
 Science education in England
 Special education in England
 List of universities in England
 List of universities in the United Kingdom

Notes

References

Further reading

 Martin, Mary Clare. "Church, school and locality: Revisiting the historiography of 'state' and 'religious' educational infrastructures in England and Wales, 1780–1870." Paedagogica Historica 49.1 (2013): 70–81.
 Passow, A. Harry et al. The National Case Study: An Empirical Comparative Study of Twenty-One Educational Systems. (1976) online

External links
 Department for Education
 Fully searchable UK school guide independent and state
 Department for Business, Innovation and Skills
 A history of education in England by Derek Gillard, an advocate of the comprehensive system
 
 
 Guardian Special Report - Education
 Statistics: school and pupil numbers Department for Education

 
Secondary education by country